Enea Pavani (born 24 October 1920 in Cortina d'Ampezzo, died 4 October 1998 in Cortina d'Ampezzo) was an Italian curler.

At the international level, he is a  bronze medallist.

At the national level, he is an eight-time Italian men's champion curler.

Teams

Personal life
His children, son Andrea Pavani and daughter Marina Pavani, are also a curlers and multi-time Italian curling champions.

References

External links
 

1920 births
1998 deaths
People from Cortina d'Ampezzo
Italian male curlers
Italian curling champions
Sportspeople from the Province of Belluno